The TCW Tower is a 37-story,  skyscraper in Los Angeles, California. It is the 19th tallest building in the city. The building was completed in 1990 when it and its designer, Albert C. Martin & Associates, were awarded the Outstanding Structural Design Award by the Los Angeles Tall Building Structural Design Council.

Tenants
Law Offices of Harris & Associates
Quinn Emanuel Urquhart & Sullivan
TCW Group

See also
List of tallest buildings in Los Angeles

References

External links
  The TCW Tower at Southland Architecture

Office buildings completed in 1990
Headquarters in the United States
Skyscraper office buildings in Los Angeles
Westlake, Los Angeles